A number of squares are named after the Slovak National Uprising, SNP for short.

These include:
 SNP Square (Bratislava)
 SNP Square (Banská Bystrica)